Spreo is an alternative genus of starling in the family Sturnidae. They are now usually lumped in the genus Lamprotornis.  
It contains the following species:

 
Bird genera
Sturnidae
Taxonomy articles created by Polbot
Obsolete bird taxa
Taxa named by René Lesson